Rear-Admiral Edward Boxer CB (Dover, 27 February 1784 – Balaklava, 4 June 1855) was an officer of the Royal Navy. He served during the French Revolutionary and Napoleonic Wars, and died during the Crimean War with the rank of rear-admiral.

Life
Boxer entered the navy in July 1798.

In 1822 he commanded the 18-gun  on the Halifax, Nova Scotia station in Canada and was posted out of her on 23 June 1823. From 1827 to 1830 he commanded  as flag-captain to Sir Charles Ogle at Halifax.

For his services at that time he received the Turkish gold medal, and was made Companion of the Bath on 18 December 1840. In August 1843 he was appointed harbour-master at Quebec City, and held that office till his promotion to flag-rank on 5 March 1853.

In December 1854 Edward Boxer was appointed second in command in the Mediterranean, and undertook the duties of superintendent at Balaklava in the Crimean War. This involved responsibility for inadequate harbour facilities that were heavily used. Boxer died of cholera on board the Jason, just outside the harbour, on 4 June 1855.

References

See also
 

Attribution

1784 births
1855 deaths
Royal Navy rear admirals
Companions of the Order of the Bath
Royal Navy personnel of the French Revolutionary Wars
Royal Navy personnel of the Napoleonic Wars
Royal Navy personnel of the Crimean War
British military personnel killed in the Crimean War
Deaths from cholera
People from Dover, Kent